The FIS Alpine World Ski Championships 1954 were held in Åre, Sweden, from 28 February – 7 March.

Olympic champion Stein Eriksen of Norway won three gold medals and was eighth in the downhill. The combined event returned as a "paper race" (through 1980), based on the best average finish in all three events, all of which had to be completed.

The World Championships returned to Åre in 2007 and 2019.

Men's competitions

Downhill
Sunday, 7 March 1954

Giant Slalom
Wednesday, 3 March 1954

Slalom
Sunday, 28 February 1954

Combination

Women's competitions

Downhill
Monday, 1 March 1954
<div style="float:left;text-align:left;padding-right:15px">

Giant Slalom
Thursday, 4 March 1954

Slalom
Saturday, 6 March 1954

Combination

Medals table
References

External links
FIS-ski.com - results - 1954 World Championships - Åre, Sweden
FIS-ski.com - results - World Championships

1954 in alpine skiing
1954
Alpine Skiing
Alpine skiing competitions in Sweden
1954 in Swedish sport
March 1954 sports events in Europe
Sport in Åre